Aznakayevo (Aznaqay) is a town in the Republic of Tatarstan, Russia, located on the Styarlya River (left tributary of the Ik),  southeast from Kazan. Population:

History
It was founded in 1762 and was known as a selo by 1859. It was granted urban-type settlement status in 1956 and town status in 1987.

Geography

Administrative and municipal status
Within the framework of administrative divisions, Aznakayevo serves as the administrative center of Aznakayevsky District, even though it is not a part of it. As an administrative division, it is incorporated separately as the town of republic significance of Aznakayevo—an administrative unit with the status equal to that of the districts. As a municipal division, the town of republic significance of Aznakayevo is incorporated within Aznakayevsky Municipal District as Aznakayevo Urban Settlement.

Industry
Oil-producing industry is highly developed (oil and gas producing administration "Aznakayevskneft", JSC "RITEK-introduction"); there are some car-building and metal-working  enterprises (JSC "Aznakayevo plant "Neftemash"), food industry (Aznakayevo butter-making factory, AO "Aznakayevo Bread", AO "Aznakayevo foodstuff factory"), and light industry (JSC "Aznakayevo Clothes").

References

Notes

Sources

External links
Official website of Aznakayevo 
Directory of organizations in Aznakayevo 

Cities and towns in Tatarstan
Bugulminsky Uyezd
Populated places established in 1762
1762 establishments in the Russian Empire